Albert Sauer (17 August 1898, Misdroy – 3 May 1945, Falkensee) was a German commandant of Mauthausen-Gusen concentration camp.

Life

Sauer, a carpenter by trade, became a member of the NSDAP (Nazi Party) and the SS in 1931.  After a period of unemployment, he became a full-time SS employee.

A protégé of the Inspector of Concentration Camps Theodor Eicke, Sauer was assigned to the SS guard unit (Wachtruppe) of Oranienburg concentration camp in April 1935.  From 1 April 1936, he was commandant of Bad Sulza concentration camp.  Between 1 August 1937 and mid-1938, Sauer was second Schutzhaftlagerführer in Sachsenhausen concentration camp and thus belonged to "Wachtruppe Brandenburg".  In the period between 1 August 1938 and 1 April 1939, he officially acted as commandant of the then-temporary quarry Wienergraben, so named because of the Wienergraben Valley in which it was located, of Granitwerke Mauthausen, which relied on slave labor from the subcamps of Mauthausen-Gusen.  Due to negligence and excessive mildness to the concentration camp inmates, Sauer was removed from the camp service in April 1939.

On 9 February 1939, he was replaced as camp commandant by SS-Sturmbannführer Franz Ziereis.  In the period of 1941-1942, he had an official position in the RKFDV (Reichskommissar für die Festigung deutschen Volkstums; Reich Commissioner for the Consolidation of German Nationhood).

From September 1942 to April 1943, Sauer was again Schutzhaftlagerführer in Sachsenhausen.  In 1943, Sauer was involved in the destruction of the Riga Ghetto.  Later, he was temporarily the commandant of Kaiserwald concentration camp, which was vacated in July 1944.  This operation was completed in September 1944. He died of wounds received at Falkensee on 3 May 1945.

Bibliography
 Eberhard Jäckel et al.: Enzyklopädie des Holocaust, Vol. 2, Tel Aviv
 Stefan Hördler: Die Schlussphase des Konzentrationslagers Ravensbrück, in: Zeitschrift für Geschichtswissenschaft, Book 3, 2008, p. 229, Fn 34
 Wolfgang Benz, Barbara Distel (ed.): Der Ort des Terrors: Geschichte der nationalsozialistischen Konzentrationslager, Flossenbürg, Mauthausen, Ravensbrück, Vol. 4, Munich 2006,

References

1898 births
1945 deaths
People from Kamień County
Nazi concentration camp commandants
Schutzhaftlagerführer
Mauthausen concentration camp personnel
Sachsenhausen concentration camp personnel
Kaiserwald concentration camp personnel
Holocaust perpetrators in Latvia
Riga Ghetto
SS officers
German carpenters
German military personnel killed in World War II